The Two Faces of Mitchell and Webb was a live stage tour undertaken by the comedy team of David Mitchell and Robert Webb, accompanied by their frequent collaborators James Bachman and Abigail Burdess, who played supporting roles.

Overview
The show toured forty-four venues in the UK between October and December 2006.  The content of the tour was adapted by Mitchell, Webb, and director Nick Morris from material previously generated by the team, particularly the sketch shows That Mitchell and Webb Look and That Mitchell and Webb Sound, with significant focus placed on recurring sketches and characters. These included Ted and Peter, Numberwang, The Party Planners, Big Talk, The Surprising Adventures of Sir Digby Chicken-Caesar, The Honeymoon's Over and The Lazy Film Writers.

Media releases
The date at the Grand Opera House in York on 27 October 2006 was filmed for a DVD release, which was released in the UK (Region 2) on 27 November 2006 by Universal.  The disc included a teaser trailer for the film Magicians, in which both Mitchell and Webb starred. A double disc CD was also released in 2006 by Universal Pictures.

References 

Comedy tours